James Wolf (March 4, 1952 – December 17, 2003) was a professional American football defensive lineman in the National Football League (NFL). He played two seasons for the Pittsburgh Steelers and the Kansas City Chiefs. He died of multiple sclerosis.

1952 births
2003 deaths
American football defensive ends
American football defensive tackles
Kansas City Chiefs players
Sportspeople from Tyler, Texas
Pittsburgh Steelers players
Players of American football from Texas
Prairie View A&M Panthers football players